The 1908 Minnesota Golden Gophers football team represented the University of Minnesota in the 1908 college football season. In their ninth year under head coach Henry L. Williams, the Golden Gophers compiled a 3–2–1 record (0–2 against Western Conference opponents) and were outscored by all their opponents by a combined total of 50 to 32.
 
The 1908 season was the first season in which the Minnesota football team was outscored by its season opponents.

Center Orren Safford was named All-Big Ten first team.

Schedule

References

Minnesota
Minnesota Golden Gophers football seasons
Minnesota Golden Gophers football